Levelling up (or leveling up) may refer to:

 The Levelling-up policy of the British government, instigated by Boris Johnson in 2019, and present in various departmental and ministerial titles:
 Department for Levelling Up, Housing and Communities
 Secretary of State for Levelling Up, Housing and Communities
 Shadow Secretary of State for Levelling Up, Housing and Communities
Gaining enough experience points to reach the next level in computer, video or role-playing games
Leveling Up, a 2013 play by American playwright Deborah Zoe Laufer